L'Album du peuple – Tome 3 is the third comedy album from François Pérusse.

Track listing 
 "Intro"
 "Carrières et professions"
 "Sagouine'N Roses"
 "Dans le derrière du micro"
 "Les Gypsys cognent"
 "Soyons diplomates"
 "Centre d'achats 1"
 "Pauvre père Noël"
 "Centre d'achats 2"
 "Kick en stock"
 "Caroline"

References 

1994 albums
François Pérusse albums